John Josephus Hicks Jr. (December 21, 1941 – May 10, 2006) was an American jazz pianist, composer, and arranger. He was leader of more than 30 recordings and played as a sideman on more than 300.

After early experiences backing blues musicians, Hicks moved to New York in 1963. He was part of Art Blakey's band for two years, accompanied vocalist Betty Carter from 1965 to 1967, before joining Woody Herman's big band, where he stayed until 1970. Following these associations, Hicks expanded into freer bands, including those of trumpeters Charles Tolliver and Lester Bowie. He rejoined Carter in 1975; the five-year stay brought him more attention and helped to launch his recording career as a leader. He continued to play and record extensively in the United States and internationally. Under his own leadership, his recordings were mostly bebop-influenced, while those for other leaders continued to be in a diversity of styles, including multi-year associations with saxophonists Arthur Blythe, David Murray, David "Fathead" Newman, and Pharoah Sanders.

Early life
Hicks was born in Atlanta, Georgia, on December 21, 1941, the eldest of five children. As a child, he moved with his family around the United States, as his father, Rev. John Hicks Sr, took up jobs with the Methodist church. His family was middle class: "I was brought up as a decent human being, where you had aspirations and there were expectations", he commented. His mother, Pollie, was his first piano teacher, after he began playing aged six or seven in Los Angeles. 
He took organ lessons, sang in choirs and tried the violin and trombone. Around the age of 11, once he could read music, Hicks started playing the piano in church.

His development accelerated once his family moved to St. Louis, when Hicks was 14 and he settled on the piano. There, he attended Sumner High School and played in schoolmate Lester Bowie's band, the Continentals, which performed in a variety of musical styles. Hicks cited influences "from Fats Waller to Thelonious Monk to Methodist church hymns", as well as local pianists. He was initially interested in the blues-based compositions of Horace Silver and popular songs such as "I Got Rhythm" and "There Will Never Be Another You", for their easily recognised harmonies.

Hicks worked summer gigs in the southern United States with blues musicians Little Milton and Albert King. His stint with Little Milton provided his first professional work, in 1958; Hicks stated that his playing in a variety of keys improved because the venue's piano was so out of tune that he had to transpose each piece that they played. He studied music in 1958 at Lincoln University in Pennsylvania, where he shared a room with drummer Ronald Shannon Jackson. He also studied for a short time at the Berklee School of Music in Boston before moving to New York in 1963.

Later life and career

1963–80
In New York, Hicks first accompanied singer Della Reese. He then played with Joe Farrell and toured with trombonist Al Grey and tenor saxophonist Billy Mitchell. In 1963 he was also part of saxophonist Pharoah Sanders' first band, and appeared on CBC Television backing vocalist Jimmy Witherspoon. After periods with Kenny Dorham and Joe Henderson, Hicks joined Art Blakey's Jazz Messengers in 1964. His recording debut was with Blakey in November that year on the album 'S Make It. Early in 1965, Hicks toured with Blakey to Japan, France, Switzerland, and England. Blakey encouraged his band members, including Hicks, to compose for the band, although they also played compositions by previous members of the band. He stayed with Blakey for two years, during which time his playing was compared with that of McCoy Tyner, for the level of energy displayed and for some of the intervals that they used.

In the period 1965 to 1967, Hicks worked on and off with vocalist Betty Carter; her liking for slow ballads helped him develop his sense of time. He then joined Woody Herman's big band, where he stayed until 1970, playing as well as writing arrangements for the band. Hicks also began recording as a sideman with a wide range of leaders – in the 1960s these included Booker Ervin, Hank Mobley, and Lee Morgan – a trend that continued for the remainder of his career. From 1972 to 1973, Hicks taught jazz history and improvisation at Southern Illinois University. From the 1970s, he also played in more avant garde bands, beginning with recordings led by Oliver Lake and performances and recordings in the Netherlands with Charles Tolliver. He played with Blakey again in 1973. Hicks' debut recording as leader was on May 21, 1975, in England. The session resulted in two albums – the trio Hells Bells, with bassist Clint Houston and drummer Cliff Barbaro, and the solo piano Steadfast – that were released by Strata-East Records several years later.

Hicks reunited with Carter in 1975, including accompanying her in a musical play, Don't Call Me Man, that year. After recording with Carter on her Now It's My Turn in 1976, Hicks returned to her band full-time; this raised his profile and led to his own recording – After the Morning. His sideman recording also continued, including with Carter Jefferson (1978) and Chico Freeman (1978–79). Hicks was dismissed in 1980 by Carter, a forceful bandleader, for drinking.

1981–89
Some Other Time in 1981, with bassist Walter Booker and drummer Idris Muhammad, revealed more of Hicks as a composer, and included his best-known song, "Naima's Love Song".

Hicks was the leader of groups from the mid-1970s onwards. His small groups included a quartet featuring Sonny Fortune, Walter Booker, and Jimmy Cobb (1975–82, from 1990); a group featuring the flutist Elise Wood (with or without a drummer); and other groups featuring Gary Bartz, Vincent Herring, saxophonist Craig Handy, bassists Curtis Lundy or Ray Drummond and drummers Idris Muhammad or Victor Lewis. His quintets and sextets included Robin Eubanks and Tolliver (both from 1982), Branford Marsalis (1982–4), Hannibal Peterson (from 1983), Wynton Marsalis (1983–4), Craig Harris (1985–6), Eddie Henderson (1985–6, 1988–90), and Freeman (1985–8). A big band was created in autumn 1982 and revived on occasion subsequently. He played in the UK with Freeman's band in 1989.

From 1983, the flautist Elise Wood was frequently a member of his groups. As a duo, they played mostly jazz, but also some classical music. They formed a business partnership – John Hicks-Elise Wood, Inc. – and toured the US, Europe and Japan in the 1980s.

He also freelanced, including with players such as Arthur Blythe, David Murray, and Pharoah Sanders. During the 1980s, was a sideman for Richie Cole (1980), Arthur Blythe (In the Tradition), David Murray, Hamiet Bluiett, Art Davis, and Pharoah Sanders; recording with as Ricky Ford (1980, 1982), Alvin Queen (1981), Peter Leitch (1984), Herring (1986), and Bobby Watson (1986, 1988). In 1984, he had a big band that rehearsed; a sextet from it played concerts. From around 1989 into the 1990s, he played with the Mingus Dynasty band, including for performances of the symphony Epitaph. He recorded two albums in Japan in 1988 – the trio East Side Blues and the quartet Naima's Love Song, with altoist Bobby Watson added. By now making regular appearances at jazz festivals internationally, Hicks continued to perform in New York City.

1990–2006
Hicks divorced his wife, Olympia, in the early 1990s. The couple had a son and daughter (Jamil Malik and Naima).

Like many jazz musicians in the 1990s, Hicks recorded for multiple labels proposing different recording ideas. The resultant recordings included duo sessions with Jay McShann (1992) and Leitch (1994) for the American Reservoir Records, and several trio-based sessions for Japanese labels – the New York Unit with bassist Richard Davis and drummer Tatsuya Nakamura for Paddle Wheel Records, and the New York Rhythm Machine with bassist Marcus McLaurine and drummer Victor Lewis for Venus Records. These were followed by more trio recordings for other labels – the Keystone Trio of George Mraz and Muhammad for the Milestone label from 1995, and a longer-lasting band with Dwayne Dolphin on bass and Cecil Brooks III on drums for HighNote Records from 1997. The last of these included his most commercially successful recordings, which were tributes to other pianists, including Something to Live For: A Billy Strayhorn Songbook, Impressions of Mary Lou, and Fatha's Day: An Earl Hines Songbook. There were five such albums, all linked to Pittsburgh-associated pianist-composers; the other two were Nightwind: An Erroll Garner Songbook, and Music in the Key of Clark for Sonny Clark. Hicks played on five of David "Fathead" Newman's albums for HighNote, and was described in 2000 as the "HighNote house pianist".

There were also more dates as a sideman for Murray, Leitch, Blythe, Freeman, and Roy Hargrove (1989–90, 1995), Bartz (1990), Lake (1991), Steve Marcus and Valery Ponomarev (both 1993), Nick Brignola, Russell Gunn, and Kevin Mahogany (all 1994), the Mingus Big Band (c1995), Fortune (1996), and Jimmy Ponder (1997). As leader, his repertoire in the 1990s was often of familiar standards. He performed in the UK with the Mingus Big Band in 1999, and played on their album Blues and Politics in the same year. The pianist recorded the seventh instalment of the "Live at Maybeck Recital Hall" series of solo piano concerts which were recorded for Concord Records. He was part of Joe Lovano's quartet in 1998, which led to Hicks being part of the saxophonist's nonet from its formation the following year.

Hicks and Wood married in June 2001. He made a rare recording on organ (Hammond B3) on saxophonist Arthur Blythe's Exhale. Over the last decade or so of Hicks life, he recorded several collaborations with Elise Wood to mixed reviews (Single Petal of a Rose, Trio & Strings, Beautiful Friendship).

Towards the end of his life, Hicks taught at New York University and The New School in New York. Asked about his teaching in January 2006, Hicks replied that "I don't care how advanced my students are, I always start them off with the blues. It all comes from there." Early in 2006, Hicks again played in a big band, this time led by Charles Tolliver. In January and February, he toured Israel, chiefly playing Thelonious Monk compositions. Hicks' final studio recording was On the Wings of an Eagle in March 2006. His last performance was at St Mark's United Methodist Church in New York City a few days before he died. He died on May 10, 2006, from internal bleeding. Hicks is buried at South-View Cemetery in his hometown of Atlanta.

Wood survived him, and has led a band dedicated to his music. In the view of AllMusic reviewer Michael G. Nastos, "Hicks died before reaping the ultimate rewards and high praise he deserved". A collection of his papers and compositions, as well as video and audio recordings, is held by Duke University.

Playing style
Fellow pianist George Cables stated that Hicks "was a very strong and energetic player, and a very warm player, very much part of the tradition". Hicks's playing was sometimes criticized as being insubstantial; The Penguin Guide to Jazz commented that "This [...] is missing the point. Almost always, he is more concerned to work within the dimensions of a song than to go off into the stratosphere."

Hicks had a style of his own, containing a "combination of irresistible creativity and responsiveness [...] encompassing swing, hard bop and the avant garde, and made him a first-call choice for many of the most important American modern jazz groups". A reviewer of a 1993 release, Lover Man: A Tribute to Billie Holiday, commented that Hicks "mastered the technique of shaping a piano chord so it sounds like the rising and falling of a breath". A few years later, another reviewer highlighted the "subtle dynamic shadings" of Hicks's left hand, and his "reverence for melody and a sense of musical destination that gives form to his improvisations." As an accompanist, Hicks played delicately, with carefully voiced chords.

Compositions and arrangements
His compositions "are wandering and melodic, suggestive and malleable yet memorable". He "enjoyed writing arrangements for a quintet or sextet, often, like the finest jazz composers, tailoring parts to specific musicians. In the past, these have included artists of the caliber of Bobby Watson and Vincent Herring; more recently he has been working with Javon Jackson and Elise [Wood]".

Discography
An asterisk (*) after the year indicates that it is the year of release.

As leader/co-leader

As sideman

References 

Bibliography

1941 births
2006 deaths
African-American jazz composers
African-American jazz pianists
American male pianists
Chesky Records artists
DIW Records artists
The Jazz Messengers members
American male jazz composers
American jazz composers
Milestone Records artists
Mingus Big Band members
Musicians from Atlanta
Palmetto Records artists
Red Baron Records artists
Reservoir Records artists
Strata-East Records artists
Sumner High School (St. Louis) alumni
Timeless Records artists
Mapleshade Records artists
20th-century jazz composers
HighNote Records artists
Burials at South-View Cemetery
20th-century American male musicians